Zdeněk Jičínský (26 February 1929 – 9 April 2020) was a Czech lawyer, politician, co-architect of the Constitution of the Czech Republic, and Charter 77 signatory. He served as a Deputy from 1996 to 2002 and from 2003 until 2010.

References

1929 births
2020 deaths
Czech jurists
Charter 77 signatories
Members of the Chamber of Deputies of the Czech Republic (2006–2010)
Members of the Chamber of Deputies of the Czech Republic (2002–2006)
Members of the Chamber of Deputies of the Czech Republic (1996–1998)
Members of the Federal Assembly of Czechoslovakia
Members of the Czech National Council
Recipients of Medal of Merit (Czech Republic)
Academic staff of Charles University
Czech Social Democratic Party MPs
Civic Movement politicians
Czech Social Democratic Party politicians
Communist Party of Czechoslovakia politicians
Charles University alumni
People from Pardubice District